"12.38" is a song by American rapper Donald Glover, performed under the stage name Childish Gambino, from his fourth studio album, 3.15.20 (2020). The song features guest vocals by rapper 21 Savage, American singer-songwriter Atia "Ink" Boggs, and American musician Kadhja Bonet. It was written by the artists and DJ Dahi who produced it with Gambino.

Glover sings about a psilocybin-induced trip with a girl, while 21 Savage raps about police harassment. Critics praised the song's comedic narrative and 21 Savage's guest appearance. "12.38" peaked at number 22 on the NZ Hot Singles published by Recorded Music NZ.

Background and recording

Producer DJ Dahi called the creation of the song an evolving process. Dahi had an initial beat with chords provided by Ely Rise. Kadhja Bonet's vocals were for another track, but were chopped and reused for "12.38". Dahi described the track as having "funky, odd, but feels good" energy. The song was momentarily put to the side, but Gambino continued writing his verse. Rapper 21 Savage recorded his guest verse and American singer-songwriter Atia "Ink" Boggs was invited to co-write on the song. Glover and 21 Savage previously collaborated in 2018 on the former's single "This Is America" and the track "Monster" from the latter's second studio album I Am > I Was.

Composition and lyrics

Noah Yoo of Pitchfork described the production of "12.38" as a "sensual, minimalistic bounce." The song interpolates André 3000's song "Vibrate". In the song, a girl feeds Glover psilocybin, who is unfamiliar with the psychedelic drug. Sexual tension builds up as his girlfriend keeps texting him, causing his phone to vibrate. Glover uses humorous lines such as "Why your cat looking at me sideways?" in place of a hook and chorus. His verse continues as a beat-by-beat breakdown of the psilocybin use, until he wakes up alone. He name-checks multiple female artists, including Toni Braxton, SZA, and Chaka Khan.

21 Savage raps about police harassment; he was previously detained by U.S. Immigration and Customs Enforcement in February 2019. 21 Savage also raps about Popeyes' chicken and cartoon character Popeye's spinach. By the end, the song "devolves into spirals of vocal echoes" as a result of the psilocybin trip kicking in.

Release and promotion
The song originally surfaced under the unofficial title "Vibrate" when Glover streamed 3.15.20 on his website on March 15, 2020. The track was titled "12.38" upon the album's official release on March 22, 2020. Only the tracks "Algorythm" and "Time" have proper names; the rest, such as "12.38", are marked by their respective timestamps. "12.38" was released as a single to urban adult contemporary radio on April 14, 2020, along with "Sweet Thang (24.19)".

Critical reception
Kitty Empire of The Guardian called the song excellent and described it as having "the feel of narrative fiction". Empire stated that the song "could be an episode of Atlanta," an American comedy-drama television series created by Glover. Rowan5215 of Sputnikmusic called the song hilarious and wrote that Glover "[weaponizes] his full range to spin some The Love Below-style seduction." Okla Jones of Consequence of Sound called the song witty and sonically-pleasing as Glover "taps into his prowess as both a writer and a comic." Jones wrote that 21 Savage's verse had Southern charm and was must-needed. Noah Yoo of Pitchfork praised 21 Savage's "particularly on point" guest appearance. Yoo wrote that as the song ends in spiraling echoes, "it's 21's lyrics you’re left thinking about."

Personnel
Credits adapted from Tidal.

 Childish Gambino – lead artist, producer, lyricist, composer
 21 Savage – featured vocals, lyricist, composer
 Atia "Ink" Boggs – featured vocals, lyricist, composer
 Kadhja Bonet – featured vocals, lyricist, composer
 DJ Dahi – producer, lyricist, composer
 Chukwudi Hodge – drums
 Kurtis McKenzie – drums
 Carlos "Loshendrix" Munoz – guitar
 Ely Rise – keyboards
 James Francies, Jr. – synthesizers
 Riley Mackin – recording, mixing

Charts

References

2020 songs
Donald Glover songs
Songs written by Donald Glover
Songs written by 21 Savage
Songs about drugs